Promise Lebo Mkhuma (born 24 May 2000) is a South African soccer player currently playing as a forward for Moroka Swallows on loan from Mamelodi Sundowns.

References

2000 births
Living people
South African soccer players
South Africa youth international soccer players
Association football forwards
South African Premier Division players
Mamelodi Sundowns F.C. players
South Africa under-20 international soccer players